Gary Kirkpatrick  (August 19, 1941 - February 22, 2021) was an American concert pianist from Junction City, Kansas.

Kirkpatrick received his Bachelor of Music at Eastman School of Music and his artist's diploma from the University of Music and Performing Arts, Vienna.

Kirkpatrick was a member of the award-winning Vehrder Trio, composed of a rare violin, clarinet and piano. The ensemble commissioned over 100 pieces, including five triple concertos, by such composers as Alan Hovhannes, Gunther Schuller, Ned Rorem and many others. They have recorded over 15 installments in the Making of a Medium CD Series.

Recently, Kirkpatrick was a member of The Halcyon Trio, a trio for Clarinet, Viola, and Piano. The instrumentation of this ensemble was invented by Mozart in his Kegelstatt Trio K. 498 for the same instrumentation known as Kegelstadt. The movie composer Lalo Schiffrin,  composer of the theme from Mission: Impossible, was commissioned to compose a triple concerto for the Halcyon Trio, which was premiered at The New Jersey Performing Arts Center in Newark, New Jersey with the New Jersey Symphony Orchestra conducted by Anne Mason.

He was recipient of the Top Prize in the International Piano Competition Premio in Jaén, Spain and the Stepenov Piano Competition. He made his New York City debut at Carnegie Recital Hall. He has worked as a soloist, chamber musician and teacher. He has performed in more than 40 countries, and has recently given the world premiere of John Link's Piano Concerto, premiered by the Wayne Chamber Orchestra.

Kirkpatrick was professor of music at William Paterson University, where he taught from 1973 to 2019. He received The Dean's Award for Excellent Artistic Achievement in 1995 for excellence in teaching. Kirkpatrick died on February 22, 2021, at age 79.

References

1941 births
2021 deaths
American male pianists
21st-century American pianists
21st-century American male musicians
People from Junction City, Kansas